Edith M. Ainge (1873–1948) was an American suffragist and a Silent Sentinel. Ainge joined the National Woman's Party NWP led by Alice Paul, aiming to get the 19th amendment ratified (ratified in 1920). Ainge was arrested approximately five times from September 1917 to January 1919 for "unlawful assembly" at NWP protests, and she eventually went on to serve as treasurer of the NWP.

Suffrage in New York 
Ainge worked for the movement to gain suffrage in New York state in 1915. She spearheaded participation in The Torch of Liberty event where suffragists from New York, New Jersey, and Pennsylvania—organizing events to gather more participation and awareness about the cause, and to raise funding for the suffragist movement and for the political rallies.

Night of Terror 
Following her work on New York State Suffrage, Ainge moved to New York to rally for National voting rights for women. On November 10, 1917 suffragists Edith Ainge and Eleanor Calnan were two of thirty three arrested after stationing themselves in protest in front of the White House in Washington D.C. The protest was peaceful, and 68 suffragists demonstrated for the passage of the 19th Amendment. Ainge and Calnan carried a sign that read, “How Long Must Woman Be Denied a Voice in a Government Which is Conscripting Their Sons.” Ainge, and other suffragists were sentenced to 60 days in jail at the Occoquan Workhouse in Lorton, Virginia for "Unlawful Assembly.” Ainge was given solitary confinement, many of those arrested were tortured, and the event has been named the "Night of Terror."

1918 arrest 
Ainge was again arrested for demonstrating in Lafayette Square on August 15, 1918.

Watch Fire Demonstration, 1919 
At the Watch Fire Demonstrations, in Lafayette Square, members of the NWP burned copies of President Woodrow Wilson's speeches in urns. Ainge was the first to light her urn. The women, including Ainge were again arrested.

Personal life 
Ainge was born in England and emigrated to the U.S. as a child in 1884. Her parents William and Susan Ainge had a total of ten children.

References 

1873 births
1948 deaths
American suffragists
Activists from New York (state)
People from Jamestown, New York
British emigrants to the United States
National Woman's Party activists